Dangerous Afternoon is a 1961 British crime film directed by Charles Saunders and starring Ruth Dunning. It was primarily filmed at Twickenham Studios, with the shops next to Strawberry Hill railway station, notably the chemist's in Wellesley Parade, being used for external location shots.

Cast
 Ruth Dunning as Miss Letty Frost
 Nora Nicholson as Mrs Louisa Sprule
 Joanna Dunham as Freda
 Howard Pays as Jack Loring
 May Hallatt as Miss Burge
 Gwenda Wilson as Miss Jean Berry
 Ian Colin	as Reverend Everard Porson
 Gladys Henson as Miss Cassell
 Barbara Everest as Mrs Judson
 Max Brimmell as Dr Spalding
 James Raglan as Sir Phillip Morstan
 Trevor Reid as Inspector Craven
 Jerold Wells as George "Butch" Birling

References

External links
 

1961 films
British crime films
Films directed by Charles Saunders
1961 crime films
British films based on plays
British black-and-white films
1960s English-language films
1960s British films